Hibbertia vaginata is a species of flowering plant in the family Dilleniaceae and is endemic to the south-west of Western Australia.

It was first formally described in 1863 by George Bentham who gave it the name Candollea vaginata in Flora Australiensis from specimens collected by James Drummond. In 1880, Ferdinand von Mueller changed the name to Hibbertia vaginata in Fragmenta Phytographiae Australiae. The specific epithet (vaginata) means "sheathed", referring to the leaf base.

This hibbertia grows in sandy or gravelly soils in the Jarrah Forest, Swan Coastal Plain and Warren biogeographical regions of south-western Western Australia.

Hibbertia vaginata is classified as "not threatened" by the Western Australian Government Department of Parks and Wildlife.

See also
List of Hibbertia species

References

vaginata
Flora of Western Australia
Plants described in 1863
Taxa named by George Bentham